Jenn Engels is a Canadian television writer and producer, most noted as a four-time Gemini and Canadian Screen Award nominee for Best Writing in a Comedy Series.

She is an alumna of the Canadian Film Centre.

Filmography

Awards and nominations

References

External links

21st-century Canadian women writers
21st-century Canadian screenwriters
Canadian television writers
Canadian women television writers
Canadian television producers
Canadian women television producers
Canadian Film Centre alumni
Living people
Year of birth missing (living people)